The 1998–99 Israeli Hockey League season was the eighth season of Israel's hockey league. Four teams participated in the league, and HC Metulla won the championship.

Regular season

Playoffs

Semifinals 
 HC Maccabi Amos Lod - HC Bat Yam 3:1
 HC Metulla - HC Haifa 6:2

Final
 HC Maccabi Amos Lod - HC Metulla 3:4/5:6 SO

External links 
 Season on hockeyarchives.info

Israeli League
Israeli League (ice hockey) seasons
Seasons